Brad Bars (born April 24, 1992) is an American Businessman and former NFL Linebacker American football outside linebacker He played college football at Penn State.

Early years 
Attended Montgomery Bell Academy in Nashville, Tennessee where he played football, basketball, baseball, and track. As a junior and senior, he led the state of Tennessee in tackles (179), tackles for loss (32), and sacks (14) leading to two all state selections. Following his senior year, he was named an All-American (Max Emfinger). A three-star recruit by ESPN, he signed in 2010 to play football at Penn State.

College 
Bars played at Penn State, where he was a four-year letterman and four time Academic All Big Ten from 2011–2014.

Professional 
Bars was ranked the 57th defensive lineman in the draft by nfldraftscout.com where he was projected to be a priority free agent. At Penn State pro day, Bars posted 4.68 40 yard dash, a 4.24 20-yard shuttle, and a 7.05 L cone. Bars also benched 225lbs 27 reps, and jumped 32" and 9'7" in the vertical and broad jump respectively.

After going undrafted in the 2015 NFL draft, Bars attended rookie minicamp with the New York Giants where he signed a contract on August 2, 2015. Bars recorded his first NFL tackle against the Jacksonville Jaguars in Week 2. In Week 4 against the New England Patriots, he recorded 3 tackles. After preseason, he was signed to the 10-man practice squad. On December 25, 2015, the New York Giants promoted Bars and tight end Matt LaCosse to the 53-man roster and placed defensive tackle Markus Kuhn and linebacker James Morris on injured reserve.

On September 3, 2016, Bars was released by the Giants.

References

External links
Penn State Nittany Lions bio
New York Giants bio

1992 births
Living people
American football defensive ends
Penn State Nittany Lions football players
New York Giants players